The Fish Creek Covered Bridge was built circa 1881 near Hundred, West Virginia, United States. The kingpost truss bridge spans only . It is the last remaining covered bridge in Wetzel County and one of two remaining single kingpost truss bridges in West Virginia. The bridge has been structurally reinforced with six W8x12 wide-flange steel beams replacing wood stringers. The bridge is enclosed with painted wood siding and a galvanized metal roof. It was listed on the National Register of Historic Places in 1981.

The 1881 bridge was replaced by another covered bridge in 2001.

See also
List of covered bridges in West Virginia

References

External links

Bridges completed in 1881
Bridges completed in 2001
Buildings and structures in Wetzel County, West Virginia
Covered bridges on the National Register of Historic Places in West Virginia
Wooden bridges in West Virginia
Tourist attractions in Wetzel County, West Virginia
Transportation in Wetzel County, West Virginia
National Register of Historic Places in Wetzel County, West Virginia
Road bridges on the National Register of Historic Places in West Virginia
King post truss bridges in the United States
1881 establishments in West Virginia